Stay Awhile may refer to:

Music

Albums
Stay Awhile (Steve Cole album), 1998
Stay Awhile (The Kingston Trio album), 1965
Stay Awhile/I Only Want to Be with You, a 1964 album by Dusty Springfield featuring the song "Stay Awhile"

Songs
"Stay Awhile" (The Bells song), a 1971 hit song by The Bells written by Ken Tobias
"Stay Awhile" (Dusty Springfield song) from Stay Awhile/I Only Want to Be with You
"Stay Awhile" (Soraya song) from On Nights Like This  
"Stay Awhile", a 1959 song by The Clovers
"Stay Awhile", a song by Tina Turner from her 1993 album What's Love Got to Do With It
"Stay Awhile", a song by Journey from their album Departure
"Stay Awhile", a song by Kim Wilde from the album Catch as Catch Can
"Stay A While", a song by Dan Saunders from the album Wade In: The Lockdown Project